Warm Thoughts is a 1980 album by Smokey Robinson. It features the top 40 hit, "Let Me Be the Clock". The album was arranged by Reginald "Sonny" Burke. This album also featured the  semi-autobiographical tune "Wine, Women and Song", which proved to be the closest thing to a Miracles reunion that occurred in the 1980s, with Smokey doing a duet with his then-wife, former Miracle Claudette Robinson, and Miracle Marv Tarplin, with whom he shared songwriting credits, on guitar. The song "Travelin' Thru'" was written by Smokey's real-life sister, Rose Ella Jones, and two songs written by Robinson with fellow Motown artist, Stevie Wonder, and singer, songwriter, and former Starsky and Hutch star, David Soul. This album was a huge success, reaching the Top 20 of The Billboard 200 Pop Album chart, peaking at #14, and the Top 10 of Billboard's R&B Album Chart, peaking at #4.

Track listing
All tracks composed by Smokey Robinson, except where indicated.

"Let Me Be the Clock" - 5:10
"Heavy on Pride" - 4:07
"Into Each Rain Some Life Must Fall" (Doris Fisher, Allan Roberts) - 4:34
"Wine, Women and Song" (Robinson, Marv Tarplin, Pamela Moffett) - 4:45
"Melody Man" (Robinson, Stevie Wonder) - 4:53
"What's in Your Life for Me" (Robinson, David Soul) - 4:43
"I Want to Be Your Love" - 3:57
"Travelin' Thru'" (Rose Ella Jones) - 4:22

Personnel
 Smokey Robinson – lead and backing vocals 
 Reginald "Sonny" Burke – keyboards, arrangements (1-4, 6, 7, 8)
 Ron Rancifer – keyboards
 Marlo Henderson – guitar 
 Melvin Ragin – guitar
 Marv Tarplin – guitar
 Phil Upchurch – guitar
 David T. Walker – guitar
 Keni Burke – bass 
 Scott Edwards – bass 
 Wayne Tweed – bass
 James Gadson – drums 
 Scotty Harris – drums
 James Sledge – congas, backing vocals 
 Fred Smith – flute, reeds, solos 
 Michael Jacobson – cello 
 Stevie Wonder – arrangements (5)
 Cheryl Cooper – backing vocals
 Ivory Davis – backing vocals
 Patricia Henley Talbert – backing vocals
 Claudette Robinson – backing vocals, lead vocals (4)

Production
 Producer – Smokey Robinson 
 Co-Producer on Track 5 – Stevie Wonder
 Production Assistant – Randy Dunlap
 Engineer – Michael Lizzio
 Assistant Engineers – Ernestine Madison and Ginny Pallante
 Mixing – Michael Lizzio and Smokey Robinson 
 Mix Assistants – Randy Dunlap and Ginny Pallante
 Mastered by John Matousek
 Recorded, Mixed and Mastered at Motown Recording Studios (Hollywood, CA).
 Recording Coordinator – Barbara Ramsey
 Talent Coordinator – Simone Sheffield 
 Art Direction and Design – Ginny Livingston
 Cover Photo – Ron Slenzak
 Lettering – Vigon/Nahas/Vigon

References

1980 albums
Smokey Robinson albums
Albums produced by Smokey Robinson
Motown albums
Albums produced by Stevie Wonder